Henri Maréchal (22 January 1842 – 12 May 1924) was a French composer.

Life
Born in Paris, Maréchal studied music theory with Émile Chevé and Édouard Batiste and piano with Louis Chollet. On the advice of Alexis de Castillon, he entered the composition class of Victor Massé at the Conservatoire de Paris, where he also studied organ with François Benoist and counterpoint with Charles-Alexis Chauvet. In 1870 he won the Premier Grand Prix de Rome with the cantata Le Jugement de Dieu .

After the stay in the villa Medici in Rome associated with the prize, he made his debut as a composer in Paris with the "poème sacré" La Nativité (1875). He then composed several operas, ballets and dramatic music, another "drame sacré", choral and orchestral works, songs, chamber music pieces and motets. His first opera Les Amoureux de Catherine was performed for the hundredth time in 1889 and was given until 1920. Maréchal's compositional style is often characterized by chromaticism, his musical expression simple, but dramatic and effective.

He also wrote music-critical articles for Le Figaro and published several volumes of Memories and in 1910 the Monographie universelle de l'Orphéon. He corresponded with the composer Marguerite Olagnier.

Maréchal died in Paris.

Selected works
La Nativité, poème sacré, 1875
Les Amoureux de Catherine, Opera, 1876
La Taverne des Trabans, Opera, 1876
L'Ami Fritz, theatrical music, 1876
L'Etoile, Opera, 1881
Les Rantzau, theatrical music, 1882
Les vivants et les mortes for four voices and orchestra, 1886
Le Miracle de Naïm, drame sacré, 1887
Déidamie, Opera, 1893
Calendal, Opera, 1894
Esquisses vénitiennes, "Suite symphonique" for Orchestra, 1894
Pin-Sin, Opera, 1895
Daphnis et Chloé, Opera, 1899
Le Lac des Aulnes, Opera, 1907
Crime et châtiment, theatrical music
Rapsodie for violin and piano
Elégie for viola and piano, 
Chansons du Midi for Choir
Provence for Choir
Le Voyage for Choir
Agnus Dei three-part motet
Kyrie, three-part motet
Ave verum, motet for solo baritone
O Salutaris, motet

Writings
Rome: Souvenirs d'un musicien (1904)
Paris: Souvenirs d'un musicien (1907)
Monographie universelle de l'Orphéon (1910)
Lettres et Souvenirs, 1871–1874 (1920)

References

1842 births
1924 deaths
19th-century French male musicians
20th-century French male musicians
Conservatoire de Paris alumni
French ballet composers
French male classical composers
French opera composers
French Romantic composers
Musicians from Paris
Prix de Rome for composition